Bidasar or Beedasar is a village in the Laxmangarh administrative region of Sikar district of Indian state Rajasthan. It borders Khinwasar, Birodi Bari, Bidsar, Birodi Chhoti, Jogiyon ka bas, and Brahmino ki Dhani (Ramsingh Pura) villages.

The  village has an overall population of about 4,600 of whom 2,000 are members of the Jat ethnic group. Other castes include Brahmin, and Harijan.

Village government
The current sarpanch is Suman Devi. The panchayat has 16 ward members chosen by the people through polling.

Village location
The village situated on the connecting road of town Laxmangarh and  Nawalgarh.

Village economy
About 80% of the population of the village are engaged in farming. Village agriculture is dependent on the monsoon rains although today many farms use artesian wells for irrigation.

Climate
Beedasar has a hot summer, scanty rainfall, a chilly winter season and a general dryness of the air, except in the brief monsoon season. The average maximum and minimum temperatures are 28-30 and 15 - 16 degrees Celsius, respectively.

Transportation
Beedasar is connected by a two lane asphalt road to Laxmangarh and Nawalgarh. Nawalgarh Railway station,  from Beedasar is the nearest railway station, which is  well connected to Jaipur, Ajmer, Delhi and other cities. Asphalt roads connect the village to surrounding villages and to Laxmangarh.

Camel carts and bullock carts were formerly the chief means of transportation and are being replaced by bicycles and other automobiles. Quite a few villagers walked to Nawalgarh and other surrounding places. In the rainy season, womenfolk bring grass on their heads for cows and buffaloes.

Education
The villagers claim to be fully literate while all children now attend school. However, many women remain illiterate, although literacy rates are improving. Many students of the village have obtained admission to pioneering engineering institutes through various competitions run by the IIT, AIEEE etc.,  as well as into medical colleges through various competitions like AIPMT, Rajasthan Pre Medical Test  and other exams.there are there school in village.

Religion
All villagers follow the Hindu religion. Kumhar or Prajapati, Rajput, Jat, Harijan, Brahmin lives in the village. Among the Jats, the Godara, Meel are all sub castes. Harijan are divided into Kanwalia, Dugawa and Denwal subcastes. There are two family of Brahmins (1) Godhala and (2) Chotiya, Gotra Brahmins. There are Kumawat Cast also have sub cast which are Kargwal, Jalindra called Gotra.

Society, culture and festivals

Society and culture
Village society is governed solely by Hindu rituals although the younger generation has been affected by western cultural influences.

Festivals
Villagers celebrate all major Hindu festivals. Some of the major festivals are Holi, Deepawali, Makar Sankranti, Raksha Bandhan, Teej, and Goga navami, Gangaur, Shitla Asthami.

Music and entertainment
Folk songs are sung by women during weddings and on other social occasions. Menfolk sing dhamaal ( traditional Holi songs). Many villagers own TV's as well as radios and satellite dishes. The sound of popular Hindi music emanating from stereos and other devices is heard from different houses during the afternoon and evening.

Games and sports
Most of the children play cricket. In the village's schools are played football game very most. Villagers can be seen playing cards in chaupal (village common area).

References

External links
 Google map view of Beedasar
 Details of sarpanch in Sikar district
 Voter List of Beedasar panchayat samiti
 Official web page of Sikar district
 List of all the land records
 List of all villages of Rajasthan with their panchayat samiti

Villages in Sikar district